Aaronsburg is an extinct town in Morrow County, in the U.S. state of Ohio.

History
Aaronsburg was laid out in 1824 by Aaron Macomber, and named for him.

References

Geography of Morrow County, Ohio
Ghost towns in Ohio
1824 establishments in Ohio
Populated places established in 1824